Robert Geary may refer to:

Roy C. Geary, statistician
Robert Geary (wrestling promoter), see List of professional wrestling promoters
Robert Geary, conductor of Shining Night: A Portrait of Composer Morten Lauridsen

See also
Bob Geary (disambiguation)
Robert Garioch (pronounced Geary)